Vueling, a Spanish low-cost carrier, serves the following destinations (as of May 2022):

References

Lists of airline destinations